"Pine Barrens" is an episode of the HBO series The Sopranos; it is the 11th of the show's third season and the 37th overall. The teleplay was written by Terence Winter from a story idea by Winter and Tim Van Patten. It was the first of four episodes for the series directed by Steve Buscemi and originally aired on May 6, 2001.

Starring
 James Gandolfini as Tony Soprano
 Lorraine Bracco as Dr. Jennifer Melfi 
 Edie Falco as Carmela Soprano
 Michael Imperioli as Christopher Moltisanti
 Dominic Chianese as Corrado Soprano, Jr.
 Steven Van Zandt as Silvio Dante
 Tony Sirico as Paulie Gualtieri
 Jamie-Lynn Sigler as Meadow Soprano
 Robert Iler as Anthony Soprano, Jr.
 Drea de Matteo as Adriana La Cerva *
 Aida Turturro as Janice Soprano *
 Steven R. Schirripa as Bobby Baccalieri

* = credit only

Guest starring
 Tom Aldredge as Hugh De Angelis
 Vitali Baganov as Valery
 Jason Cerbone as Jackie Aprile, Jr.
 Oksana Lada as Irina Peltsin
 Annabella Sciorra as Gloria Trillo
 Suzanne Shepherd as Mary De Angelis
 Frank Ciornei as Slava Malevsky

Synopsis
Following a change in Jackie Jr.'s behavior, Meadow begins to suspect he is cheating on her. Her suspicions are confirmed when she catches him with another girl. Heartbroken, she tells him they are finished.

Gloria and Tony's relationship is growing increasingly unstable and the two frequently argue, though they always reconcile. Tony tells Dr. Melfi that he is seeing Gloria. In the first session, he speaks of how happy they are together; in the second he complains of her changing moods. Melfi says Gloria is depressive, unstable, and impossible to please, asking Tony if that reminds him of anyone (implying his mother). Tony shakes his head no.

Tony instructs Paulie to make a collection from Valery, a Russian, on behalf of Silvio, who is ill. He goes with Christopher to Valery's apartment. Paulie provokes Valery and starts a fight. Following a struggle Paulie and Christopher manage to subdue Valery and believe they have killed him. Panicked, Paulie suggests that they dump him in the Pine Barrens.

In the snow-covered woods, Paulie and Chris prepare to dump the body but find that Valery, who is revealed to be a trained commando, is still alive. They give him a shovel and instruct him to dig his own grave. While both are distracted, Valery hits them with the shovel and flees. They chase him, shooting wildly, with Paulie believing that he has hit him. They follow his track, but it ends: Valery has vanished.

After wandering in the woods trying to find their car, Paulie and Chris realize they are lost. Long after nightfall, faint with cold and hunger, they find an abandoned van where they take refuge. They blame each other for what has happened and the two fight before agreeing to stay together. In the middle of the night, Paulie manages to call Tony despite poor cell service and pleads for help. Tony drives out with Bobby, an amateur outdoorsman. They reach the parking spot but Paulie's car, containing the money from Valery, has vanished. They wait until dawn to look for Paulie and Chris and eventually find them.

Paulie gives a false version of what caused the fight with Valery, and Chris backs him up. Tony stresses to Paulie that if Valery ever turns up again, Paulie will have to take care of it. They head back to north Jersey in silence; only Bobby has peace of mind.

Valery's fate
Shortly after Valery escapes into the Pine Barrens, Paulie shoots him, apparently in the head, but he still vanishes. The camera shifts away from Paulie and Christopher to an aerial viewpoint, suggesting that Valery was watching them from a tree. In addition, Paulie's car is missing when they return. Valery was never seen again. Series creator David Chase has said that he never intended to have Valery return and that the story is richer and more realistic with some mystery to the plot. HBO listed Valery as "Deceased?" in promotional materials.

On the fate of Valery, Terence Winter said:

David Chase said:

In 2008 Chase said in an interview at the Actors Guild:

In an interview with Sam Roberts, Chase said:

Discussing the episode in a June 10, 2007 New York Times article titled "One Final Whack at That HBO Mob", Imperioli depicted the lack of closure regarding Valery as an example of the series' overall subversiveness:

In the same article, Sirico said that Chase wrote a sixth-season scene where Christopher and Paulie chanced upon Valery outside a bar and promptly shot him to death but it was removed from the script, possibly by Chase:

Deceased
 A white-tailed deer: Shot by Christopher, who had mistaken it for Valery.

Title reference
The Pine Barrens is a protected wilderness area managed by the New Jersey Pinelands Commission in Southern New Jersey. This is where Christopher and Paulie try to "dispose" of what they assume is Valery's body.

Cultural references
 The "bullshit" movie Christopher alludes to which deals with the Cuban Missile Crisis is Thirteen Days, released a year prior in 2000.
 Paulie likens Valery to Rasputin, a Russian mystic who was notoriously difficult to kill.
 When Paulie is tying on his makeshift shoe, Chris ironically likens him to Bruno Magli, the name of an Italian luxury shoe company.
 When Chris and Paulie are in the van, Chris remarks that Valery is trained and that it is like Die Hard.

Production
 Director Tim Van Patten had dreamed about the idea of Paulie and Christopher getting lost in the woods during the production of season 2, and after discussing it with writer Terence Winter, presented the concept to David Chase who worked it into season 3.
 The forest scenes for the episode were filmed at Harriman State Park in New York after the production team was denied a permit to film in New Jersey at the South Mountain Reservation. Essex County executive James Treffinger said The Sopranos "depicts an ethnic group in stereotypical fashion". This is a fairly rare instance where the show did not depict an environment similar to the one suggested, as neither Harriman State Park nor South Mountain Reservation is ecologically or visually similar to the New Jersey Pine Barrens.
 There was an unexpected snowfall just before the shoot. Both the cast and the crew agreed that the snow added to the emotional effect of the episode.
 The interior of the truck was shot on a sound stage. The actors' freezing "breath" was added in CGI.
 Director Steve Buscemi successfully threw the steak at James Gandolfini's head in the scene of Tony's argument with Gloria Trillo; neither Annabella Sciorra nor the prop handlers had been able to hit Gandolfini.
 "Pine Barrens" took 12 days for shooting, setting a record for the longest episode shoot in The Sopranos at the time.
 The HBO documentary James Gandolfini: Tribute to a Friend (2013) includes an anecdote by Steve Schirripa about the shooting of the scene where Tony picks up Bobby at Junior's house. When they were shooting Tony's reaction to Bobby's hunting outfit, Schirripa surprised Gandolfini by entering the kitchen wearing a strap-on dildo. Tony's response and laughter, pointing at Bobby and then doubling over the sink, is the take of Gandolfini seeing the strap-on.

Music
 The song played during the opening scene, where Gloria arrives at the docks, is Them's "Gloria".
 The music video A.J. is watching on the living room television is "Coffee & TV" by Blur.
 The song played during the final montage/closing credits is the aria "Sposa son disprezzata" ("I am wife and I am scorned") from the opera La Merope by Geminiano Giacomelli, sung by Cecilia Bartoli. This is the same music that opens the next episode, "Amour Fou".

Accolades
 Time and Entertainment Weekly consider this to be one of the best episodes in The Sopranos series, due largely to the offbeat and dark comedy between Paulie and Christopher.
 Former Norwegian Prime Minister Jens Stoltenberg lists this episode as his favorite in an interview with the Norwegian newspaper Dagbladet.
 In his acceptance speech for Outstanding Directing for a Drama Series at the 59th Primetime Emmy Awards, Alan Taylor thanks Steve Buscemi for his work on "Pine Barrens."
 For its 65th anniversary, TV Guide picked this as the fourth-best episode of the 21st century.
Terence Winter and Tim Van Patten received the Writers Guild of America Award for Television: Episodic Drama for their work on this episode.

References

External links
"Pine Barrens" at HBO

The Sopranos (season 3) episodes
Pine Barrens (New Jersey)
2001 American television episodes
Bottle television episodes
Television episodes written by Terence Winter